The International Requirements Engineering Board (IREB) e.V. was founded in Fürth in Germany in October 2006. IREB e.V. is as a legal entity based in Germany.

The IREB is the holder for the international certification scheme Certified Professional for Requirements Engineering (CPRE).

It is IREB's role to support a single, universally accepted, international qualification scheme, aimed at Requirements Engineering for professionals, by providing the core syllabi and by setting guidelines for accreditation and examination. The accreditation process and certification are regulated by the steering committee of IREB. The steering committee of IREB is built out of the personal members of IREB. Personal members of the IREB are international experts in requirements engineering from universities, economy and education.

Certified Professional for Requirements Engineering 
The IREB Certified Professional for Requirements Engineering (CPRE) is an international accepted qualification for requirements engineers and business analysts. The CPRE is a three level certification based on exams covering the freely available syllabus. Candidates who have successfully passed the examination receive the "Certified Professional for Requirements Engineering" certificate.

The certificate is set up according to the ISO/IEC 17024 standard with a clear separation of the duties
 IREB is responsible for the definition of syllabi and exams
 Independent Training Providers provide trainings
 Independent organizations provide the certification process
IREB is neither offering trainings nor conducting exams itself.

The education program is offered in 68 countries with over 28.500 IREB Certified Professionals for Requirements Engineering worldwide (date: 2016).

Syllabi

CPRE Foundation Level 
The IREB Syllabus for the CPRE Foundation Level of the IREB Certified Professional for Requirements Engineering
sets the following priorities:
 The focus is on acquiring the necessary practical knowledge and learning the basic concepts in Requirements Engineering, with reinforcement through practical exercises. There is no intention of presenting the complete theoretical framework or current and future research activities.
 The Foundation Level seeks to convey fundamentals that are equally valid for any domain, e.g. for embedded systems, security systems, classic information systems, etc. In addition, the training can cover the suitability of the presented approaches for the various domains based on their special characteristics. However, it is not a goal to present specific Requirements Engineering for a given domain.
 The syllabus is not based on a specific procedural model and an associated process model that stipulate the planning, control and order of carrying out the learned concepts in actual practice. No specific Requirements Engineering or even software engineering process is emphasized.
 The syllabus defines necessary knowledge of a Requirements Engineer. However, it does not elaborate on the exact interfaces between this field and other software engineering disciplines and processes. Nor is any attempt made to define other roles occurring in IT projects.
 The syllabus does not attempt to convey all methods and techniques that are used in Requirements Engineering. Rather, the course represents today’s most commonly used set of methods and techniques. Above all, the course intends to inspire attendees to actively gain for more experience in Requirements Engineering on their own authority

The CPRE Foundation Level certificate is recognized by the British Computer Society as an equivalent to the BCS Certificate in Requirements Engineering

The Syllabus for the CPRE Foundation Level is available in 12 languages: Chinese, English, French, Korean, Polish, Russian, German, Spanish, Italian, Dutch, Portuguese and Swedish.

CPRE Advanced Level 
The CPRE Advanced Level consists of a set of modules which offer sound knowledge in specific areas of the CPRE Foundation Level Syllabus. Currently two modules are published. Contrary to the Foundation Level, the Advanced Level modules are only available in English and German.

Advanced Level Requirements Elicitation 
Different sources of requirements are discussed along with many elicitation techniques like questioning techniques, observation techniques, creativity techniques and artifact-based techniques. Conflict resolution is supported by a variety of consolidation techniques and clear guidelines as to which situation to use which technique. Available in English and German.

Advanced Level Requirements Modeling 
How to use models for requirements elicitation and documentation. The main focus is on modeling of information structures, functions, behavior and scenarios in Requirements Engineering. Available in English and German.

Advanced Level Requirements Management 
This module focus on appropriate methods and techniques to effectively deal with the management of requirements throughout the product development. Available in English and German.

Advanced Level RE@Agile 
This module focuses on how to apply RE methods and techniques in agile development processes - and vice versa.

CPRE Expert level 
The Expert Level is aimed at real requirements engineering experts who hold at least three CPRE Advanced Level certificates, are actively working as requirements engineers and provide their knowledge in the field of requirements engineering as trainers or coaches.

Training 
The contents of each syllabus are taught as courses by training providers, which have been acknowledged by IREB. They are globally marketed under the brand "Certified Professional for Requirements Engineering". Training is not mandatory, self-study is possible.

Exams

CPRE Foundation Level exam 
The CPRE Foundation Level exam is a multiple choice test. It can be taken in 13 languages: Chinese, Dutch, English, French, German, Italian, Korean,  Persian, Portuguese (Brazil), Polish, Spanish, Swedish, and Russian. The details of the exam are regulated in the exam regulations for the CPRE Foundation Level

For the CPRE Foundation Level exam there are no prerequisites a candidate has to fulfill in order to take the exam. Training is not mandatory, self-study is possible.

For preparation a practice exam for the CPRE Foundation Level is free available for download.

The personal members :de:Klaus Pohl (Informatiker) and :de:Chris Rupp are authors of the book Requirements Engineering Fundamentals as reference teaching book to prepare for the exam "Certified Professional for Requirements Engineering" in the Foundation Level.

The CPRE Foundation Level certificate is valid unlimited, there is no need for recertification.

CPRE Advanced Level exam 
The CPRE Advanced Level exams are composed of a multiple choice test (similar to the Foundation level) and a written assignment which has to be elaborated by the candidate after he has passed the multiple choice test. It can be taken in English and German. The details of the exam are regulated in the exam regulations for the CPRE Advanced Level

For the CPRE Advanced Level exam a candidate has to hold a CPRE Foundation Level certificate as a prerequisite in order to take the exam. The BCS Certificate in Requirements Engineering is accepted as an equivalent to the CPRE Foundation Level certificate.

For preparation a practice exam for the CPRE Advanced Level Requirements Elicitation & Consolidation is free available for download.

The CPRE Advanced Level certificate is valid unlimited, there is no need for recertification.

Certification 
According to the ISO/IEC 17024 standard the certification is provided by independent organizations (certification bodies) which are licensed by IREB. The duties of the certification bodies:
 Conduct Foundation Level and Advanced Level exams
 Evaluate the exams
 Issue the certificates

See also 
 Requirements engineering
 Business analysis

References

Literature

External links 
 IREB Official Website
 A Guide to the Certified Professional for Requirements Engineering Article on Modern Analyst by Stefan Sturm
 The iSQI certification page
 CPRE exam page of TÜV
 CPRE exam page of the Swiss Association for Quality

Information technology organisations based in Germany
Software requirements